Western Conference Finals may refer to:
NBA Conference Finals, National Basketball Association
NHL Conference Finals, National Hockey League
KHL Conference Finals, Kontinental Hockey League